Junior Aumavae (born April 29, 1986) is a former American football nose tackle. He was signed by the Dallas Cowboys as an undrafted free agent in 2010. He played college football at Western Washington until he transferred to Minnesota State for his senior season.

Early years
He attended Palmer High School in Palmer, Alaska. In 2003, he was a recipient of the Alaska State lineman of the year award in senior year  and runner up his junior year at palmer high school.

College career

Western Washington
In his freshman season, he was selected to the First-team Great Northwestern Athletic Conference team. In his sophomore season, he was an All-North Central Conference Honorable Mention. He was a Two-time Western Washington University Defensive Player of the Week in his junior season.

Minnesota State
He transferred to Minnesota State from Western Washington prior to his senior season after learning the news that Western Washington opted to cancel its football program. He was selected to the First-team All-Northern Sun Intercollegiate Conference South and was named All- Region Team Northern Sun Intercollegiate Conference Newcomer of the Year in his senior season.

Professional career

Dallas Cowboys
On April 25, 2010 he signed with the Dallas Cowboys as undrafted free agent. On July 20, 2010, he was released during Training camp.

Fairbanks Grizzlies
On June 1, 2011, he signed with the Fairbanks Grizzlies of the Indoor Football League.

Green Bay Blizzard
On November 8, 2011, he signed with the Green Bay Blizzard of the Indoor Football League for the 2012 IFL season.

Tampa Bay Storm
On February 5, 2013, he signed with the Tampa Bay Storm of the Arena Football League.

New York Jets
On March 1, 2013, he signed with the New York Jets. He was released on August 31, 2013. He was signed to the team's practice squad on September 3, 2013. He was released on October 9, 2013.

Tampa Bay Storm
Upon his release from the Jets, Aumavae returned to the Storms active roster.

Las Vegas Outlaws
On January 30, 2015, Aumavae was assigned to the Las Vegas Outlaws.

References

External links
Western Washington Vikings bio 
Fairsbanks Grizzlies bio
New York Jets bio

1986 births
Living people
Players of American football from American Samoa
American sportspeople of Samoan descent
Players of American football from Alaska
Fairbanks Grizzlies players
Western Washington Vikings football players
Minnesota State Mavericks football players
Green Bay Blizzard players
New York Jets players
Tampa Bay Storm players
Boston Brawlers players
Las Vegas Outlaws (arena football) players
People from Palmer, Alaska
Minnesota State University, Mankato alumni